The Harms Case is a 1987 Yugoslavian drama film directed by Slobodan D. Pesic. It was screened in the Un Certain Regard section at the 1988 Cannes Film Festival.

Cast
 Mladen Andrejevic - Zabolocki (as Mladen Andrejević)
 Abdula Azinovic - Pijanac (II)
 Miroslav Bukovcic - Oficir koji puca
 Branko Cvejić - Marija Vasilijevna
 Ivana Despotovic - Ida Markovna (II)
 Ljubomir Didic - Arhivar
 Ljubomir Draskic - Svestenik
 Rahela Ferari - Stara dama
 Erol Kadic - Pijanac (I)
 Milutin Karadzic - Invalid instruktor
 Vojislav Kostic - Majstor
 Aleksandar Kothaj - Crnoberzijanac
 Violeta Kroker - Ida Markovna (I)
 Predrag Lakovic - Harmonikas (as Predrag Laković)
 Frano Lasic - Danil Harms
 Damjana Luthar - Andjeo
 Dubravka Markovic - Oficir andjeo
 Ivana Markovic - zena Fedje Davidovica
 Zoran Miljkovic - Inspektor KGB
 Zeljko Nikolic - Fedja Davidovic
 Bogoljub Petrovic - KGB ... agent
 Ljubo Skiljevic - KGB ... agent (II)
 Dijana Sporcic - Zena policajac
 Milica Tomic - Irina Mazer (as Milica Tomić)
 Milivoje Tomić - Kino operator
 Eugen Verber - Pisar
 Olivera Viktorovic - Zena u kafani
 Francisko Zegarac - Danil Harms ... dete
 Branislav Zeremski - Malogradjanin
 Stevo Žigon - Professor

References

External links

1987 films
Serbo-Croatian-language films
Serbian drama films
1987 drama films
Serbian black-and-white films
Yugoslav black-and-white films
Yugoslav drama films